Lina Lazaar (born 1982) is a Tunisian art critic and curator.

Early life and education
Although she is Tunisian, Lazaar was born in Riyadh, Saudi Arabia and grew up in Geneva, Switzerland.

She attended the London School of Economics.

Career
Lazaar is an art critic, art curator, and Sotheby's international contemporary art specialist. 

An activist promoter of Middle Eastern art, she founded Jeddah Art Week and co-founded Ibraaz.

Personal life 
Lazaar was married to Saudi Arabian businessman Hassan Jameel in 2012 and divorced in 2017.

References 

Living people
People from Riyadh
21st-century Tunisian women writers
1983 births
Tunisian art critics
Women art critics
Curators from Geneva
Alumni of the London School of Economics
Tunisian women curators